The following is a list of notable events and releases of the year 1978 in Norwegian music.

Events

March
 17 – The 5th Vossajazz started in Voss, Norway (17–19 March).

May
 24
 The 26th Bergen International Festival started in Bergen, Norway (24 May – 7 June).
 The 6th Nattjazz started in Bergen, Norway (24 May – 7 June).

August
 27 – The 10th Kalvøyafestivalen started at Kalvøya near by Oslo.

Albums released

Unknown date

A
 Arild Andersen
 Green Shading into Blue (ECM Records)

G
 Jan Garbarek
 My Song (ECM Records), with Keith Jarrett, Palle Danielsson, and Jon Christensen
 Places (ECM Records)

N
 Teddy Nelson
 Point Of Departure (Sonet Records), with Flying Norwegians

P
 Popol Ace
 Curly Sounds (Polydor Records)

R
 Terje Rypdal
 Waves (ECM Records)

T
 Jahn Teigen
 This Year's Loser (Polydor Records)

Deaths

 February
 13 – Aslak Brekke, traditional folk singer (born 1901).

 May
 20 – Bjarne Brustad, composer, violinist and violist (born 1895).

Births

 January
 30 – Jan Thore Grefstad, rock singer and songwriter.

 February
 23 – Ingrid Andsnes, classical pianist.

April
 21 – Amund Svensson, black metal guitarist, keyboardist and composer.
 23 – Lorentz Aspen, heavy metal pianist and keyboardist.

May
 5 – Ola Gjeilo, classical composer and pianist.
 7 – Stian Hinderson, black metal guitarist, bassist, drummer, keyboardist and vocalist.

 June
 17 – Esben Selvig, rapper and singer.
 24 – Nikolai Eilertsen, rock bass guitarist.

 July
 26 – Silvia Moi, operatic singer.

August
 17 – Vibeke Stene, operatic soprano.
 31 – Morten Qvenild, jazz pianist, band leader, and music producer.

September
 3 – Terje Bakken, black metal lead singer known as "Valfar", Windir, (died 2004).
 6 – Karin Park, singer, songwriter, and model.
 16
 Ane Carmen Roggen, soprano singer, conductor, music arranger, and journalist.
 Ida Roggen, jazz singer, information officer and literary scholar.
 26 – Ingfrid Breie Nyhus, classical pianist.
 29 – Kurt Nilsen, pop singer.

 October
 5 – Steinar Nickelsen, jazz organist and pianist.
 12 – Børge-Are Halvorsen, jazz saxophonist.
 20 – Venke Knutson, pop singer.
 26 – Tarjei Strøm, rock drummer and program host.
 30 – Tore Bruvoll, traditional folk guitarist, multi-instrumentalist, composer, and music arranger.

 November
 3 – Jonas Howden Sjøvaag, jazz drummer, Eple Trio.
 5 – Marita Røstad, singer-songwriter and jazz vocalist.
 9 – Even Ormestad, jazz bass guitarist and music producer, Jaga Jazzist.

 December
 12 – Lage Lund, jazz guitarist.
 30
 Daniel Heløy Davidsen, jazz guitarist.
 Julie Dahle Aagård, jazz vocalist, composer, and band leader.

 Unknown date
 Trond Frønes, prog rock bass guitarist.
 Sven Garas, pop artist, songwriter, and music producer.

See also
 1978 in Norway
 Music of Norway
 Norway in the Eurovision Song Contest 1978

References

 
Norwegian music
Norwegian
Music
1970s in Norwegian music